The 1985 Mendoza earthquake occurred with medium intensity in the province of Mendoza, Argentina. It took place 7 minutes after midnight on 26 January 1985, and had a magnitude of 6.2 in the Richter scale. Its epicenter was located about 45 km southwest of Mendoza, the provincial capital, at the southern end of the region's pre-Andes range, and at a depth of 5 km. It was felt as grade VIII in the Mercalli intensity scale.

The earthquake caused 6 deaths and about 100 injuries. In the affected Greater Mendoza area, where most of the provincial population is concentrated, one third of the buildings were built of adobe. Some 23,000 homes were destroyed or condemned, though the actual number might have been larger. Estimates vary between 50,000 and 100,000 people left homeless.

A report released soon afterwards stated that the main reason why the event did not produce thousands of casualties was its short duration (less than 10 seconds). In addition, the fact that it was a summer Friday night might have led many people to be sitting outside their homes, chatting with their neighbors, rather than sleeping inside.

References
  Stein, Enrique. May 1985. Informe sobre el terremoto de Mendoza del 26 de enero de 1985 (PDF).
  Instituto Nacional de Prevención Sísmica. Listado de Terremotos Históricos.

External links

1985
Mendoza, Argentina
Mendoza, 1985
1985 in Argentina
January 1985 events in South America
Earthquakes in Argentina